Rochelle Saunders (born 21 May 1975) is a New Zealand rower.

In 2001, she won silver at the World Championships in Lucerne, Switzerland as bow in the four with teammates Jackie Abraham-Lawrie (bow), Kate Robinson (2), and Nicky Coles (stroke).

References 

1975 births
Living people
New Zealand female rowers
World Rowing Championships medalists for New Zealand